There have been eight baronetcies created for persons with the surname Wilson, one in the Baronetage of Ireland and six in the Baronetage of the United Kingdom.

Wilson baronets, of Killenure (1629)
The Wilson Baronetcy, of Killenure in the County of Donegal, was created in the Baronetage of Ireland on 3 July 1629 for John Wilson. The title became extinct on his death in 1636.

Sir John Wilson, 1st Baronet (died 1636)

Wilson, later Maryon-Wilson baronets, of Eastbourne (1661)
The Wilson, later Maryon-Wilson Baronetcy, of Eastbourne in the County of Sussex, was created in the Baronetage of England on 4 March 1661. For more information on this creation, see Maryon-Wilson Baronets.

Wilson baronets, of Delhi (1858)

The Wilson Baronetcy, of Delhi in India, was created in the Baronetage of the United Kingdom on 8 January 1858 for the soldier Archdale Wilson, whose father Rev. George Wilson, rector of Didlington, was younger brother of Henry Wilson, 10th Baron Berners. He notably commanded the British troops during the Siege of Delhi in 1857 during the Indian Rebellion. Dying without issue, he was succeeded by two nephews, brothers Roland and Arthur Wilson. The third Baronet was a noted naval commander and served as First Sea Lord from 1910 to 1911. The title became extinct on his death in 1921.

Sir Archdale Wilson, 1st Baronet (1803–1874)
Sir Roland Knyvet Wilson, 2nd Baronet (1840–1919)
Sir Arthur Knyvet Wilson, 3rd Baronet (1842–1921)

Wilson baronets, of Eshton Hall (1874)
The Wilson Baronetcy, of Eshton Hall in the County of York, was created in the Baronetage of the United Kingdom on 16 March 1874 for the Liberal politician Mathew Wilson. He represented Clitheroe, West Riding of Yorkshire North and Skipton in the House of Commons. The fourth Baronet sat as Conservative Member of Parliament for Bethnal Green South West. The sixth Baronet was commonly known as "Tony Wilson", a retired brigadier of the British Army, commanding the 5th Infantry Brigade in the Falklands War of 1982. He lived in the United States and has published some travel books. He died in 2019 and was succeeded in the Baronetcy by his only son.

Sir Mathew Wilson, 1st Baronet (1802–1891)
Sir Mathew Wharton Wilson, 2nd Baronet (1827–1909)
Sir Mathew Amcotts Wilson, 3rd Baronet (1853–1914)
Sir Mathew Richard Henry Wilson, 4th Baronet, CSI, DSO (1875–1958)
Sir (Mathew) Martin Wilson, 5th Baronet (1906–1991)
Sir Mathew John Anthony Wilson, 6th Baronet, OBE, MC (1935-2019)
Sir Mathew Edward Amcotts Wilson (born 1966), 7th Baronet

Wilson baronets, of Archer House (1897)
The Wilson Baronetcy, of Archer House in the County of York, was created in the Baronetage of the United Kingdom on 26 August 1897 for Alexander Wilson, The title became extinct on his death in 1907.

Sir Alexander Wilson, 1st Baronet (1837–1907)

Wilson baronets, of Airdrie (1906)

The Wilson Baronetcy, of Airdrie in New Monkland in the County of Lanark, was created in the Baronetage of the United Kingdom on 27 July 1906 for John Wilson. He was Chairman of the Wilsons and Clyde Coal Company and also represented Falkirk Burghs in the House of Commons.

Sir John Wilson, 1st Baronet (1844–1918)
Sir James Robertson Wilson, 2nd Baronet (1883–1964)
Sir John Menzies Wilson, 3rd Baronet (1885–1968)
Sir Thomas Douglas Wilson, 4th Baronet (1917–1984)
Sir James William Douglas Wilson, 5th Baronet (born 1960)

Wilson baronets, of Currygrane (1919)
The Wilson Baronetcy, of Currygrane in the County of Longford, was created in the Baronetage of the United Kingdom on 3 October 1919 for Field Marshal Henry Hughes Wilson. The title became extinct when he was murdered in 1922.

Sir Henry Hughes Wilson, 1st Baronet (1864–1922)

Wilson baronets, of Carbeth (1920)

The Wilson Baronetcy, of Carbeth in Killearn in the County of Stirling, was created in the Baronetage of the United Kingdom on 11 February 1920 for David Wilson. He was a Convenor of Stirlingshire and a member of the Board of Agriculture for Scotland's Advisory Committee. The second Baronet was Keeper of the Royal Philatelic Collection from 1938 to 1969 and President of the Royal Philatelic Society London from 1934 to 1940.

Sir David Wilson, 1st Baronet (1855–1930)
Sir John Mitchell Harvey Wilson, 2nd Baronet (1898–1975)
Sir David Wilson, 3rd Baronet (1928–2014)
Sir Thomas David Wilson, 4th Baronet (born 1959)

Notes

References 
Kidd, Charles, Williamson, David (editors). Debrett's Peerage and Baronetage (1990 edition). New York: St Martin's Press, 1990,

External links
Biography 6th Baronet of Eshton Hall:
 http://www.debretts.com/people/biographies/browse/w/4533/Mathew+John.aspx

Baronetcies in the Baronetage of the United Kingdom
Extinct baronetcies in the Baronetage of Ireland
Extinct baronetcies in the Baronetage of the United Kingdom
Baronetcies created with special remainders
1629 establishments in Ireland